John Albert Johnson (July 28, 1861September 21, 1909) was an American politician. He served in the Minnesota State Senate from January 1897 to January 1901. He was the 16th governor of Minnesota from January 4, 1905, until his death on September 21, 1909. He was a Democrat.

Johnson was the first Minnesota governor born in Minnesota. He was only the second non-Republican governor in the previous 50 years and the third since statehood. He was also first to serve a full term in the present state capitol, and the first to die in office. Johnson sought the 1908 Democratic presidential nomination but lost to William Jennings Bryan.

Biography

John Albert Johnson was born on a farm near St. Peter, Minnesota, on July 28, 1861, the eldest child of Gustaf and Caroline Johnson. After Gustaf abandoned his family, John left school at 13 to support his mother and siblings. During this time, he worked at a local drugstore. After that, he had a seven-year-long stint in the Minnesota National guard, where he reached the rank of captain. Local Democrats, impressed with the enterprising young store clerk, asked him to join their party and edit the strongly Democratic St. Peter Herald. Before he could take the position, he became seriously ill with typhoid fever, but he recovered. His journalistic success attracted statewide attention and fostered political aspirations.

Johnson married Elinor M. Preston on June 1, 1894, at the Union Presbyterian Church in St. Peter.

Johnson failed in early campaigns for state office from his heavily Republican home county but was elected to the state senate in 1898, indicating his growing bipartisan appeal.

Governor
In his 1904 inauguration speech, Johnson called for the two-year term to be extended to four years, more funding for roads, more funding to rural schools, and several other important ideas. Johnson's ability to reason and work with legislators of both parties resulted in such reform legislation as a reorganization of the state's insurance department to the benefit of policyholders, reduction of railroad passenger and freight rates, and removal of constitutional restraints on the legislature's power to tax.

Johnson was reelected in 1906 and 1908. He began his third term with reservations. At that point, he had had over four surgeries for his intestinal problems, and he wanted to pursue a promising sideline as a public orator. This chronic illness forced him to head to the Mayo Clinic once again on September 13, 1909. When he died suddenly at age 48 from post-operative complications, which included an infection, the state's citizens were grief-stricken.

Legacy

Johnson was the first of three governors to die in office. Governor Winfield Scott Hammond was the second, after suffering a stroke in 1915. Floyd B. Olson was the third and most recent, dying of cancer in 1936.

Statues of Johnson are on the steps of the Minnesota State Capitol and the grounds of the Nicollet County Courthouse. Johnson Senior High School in St. Paul is named for him, as is the portion of U.S. Route 169 from Saint Peter to the Twin Cities.

The John A. Johnson School in Virginia, Minnesota was built in 1907.

References

External links

Minnesota Legislators Past and Present
John Albert Johnson photos at the Minnesota Historical Society.
Biographical information and his  gubernatorial records are available for research use at the Minnesota Historical Society.

 	

1861 births
1909 deaths
People from St. Peter, Minnesota
Democratic Party governors of Minnesota
Democratic Party Minnesota state senators
American Presbyterians
American people of Swedish descent
Candidates in the 1908 United States presidential election
20th-century American politicians
19th-century American politicians